Michael John Brown (11 April 1944 – 9 March 2021) was an English footballer who played as a forward in the Football League.

Career
Brown began his career at Fulham, where he made four appearances. Following that, he appeared for Millwall 52 times scoring 11 league goals. Brown moved to Luton Town for the 1967–68 season, scoring two in 14 appearances, before moving on to Colchester United, where he scored 12 in 52 games. He then dropped into non-league football, appearing for Wealdstone, Maidstone United, Tonbridge and Hillingdon Borough.

Death
On 9 March 2021, Millwall issued a statement on their website that Brown had died.

Honours

Club
Millwall
 Football League Third Division Runner-up: 1965–66

References

External links
 
 Micky Brown at Colchester United Archive Database

1944 births
2021 deaths
English footballers
Association football forwards
Fulham F.C. players
Colchester United F.C. players
Luton Town F.C. players
Millwall F.C. players
Wealdstone F.C. players
Maidstone United F.C. (1897) players
Hillingdon Borough F.C. players
English Football League players
Tonbridge Angels F.C. players